Feruglio may refer to:

People 
 Egidio Feruglio, Italian geologist (1897–1954)
 Egidio Feruglio (cyclist), Italian cyclist (1921–1981)
 Antonio Feruglio, bishop of Vicenza (d. 1909)
 Manlio Feruglio, Italian soldier (1892–1917)

Other 
 73442 Feruglio, an asteroid